Worster is a surname. People with the surname include:

 Alexander Worster (1887–1952), British actor
 Cecil Charles Worster-Drought (1888–1971), British medical doctor
 Donald Worster (born 1941), U.S. environmental historian
 Grae Worster (born 1958), British fluid dynamicist
 Steve Worster (1949–2022), American football player

See also

 
 Worster-Drought (disambiguation)
 The Worst (disambiguation)

Surnames